Acta Botanica Brasilica is a quarterly peer-reviewed scientific journal published by the Brazilian Society of Botany. It was established in 1987 and publishes original articles in all areas of botany, basic or applied. Articles are in Portuguese, Spanish, or English. The journal publishes original articles on all aspects of plant (including algae) and fungi biology.

Abstracting and indexing 
The journal is abstracted and indexed in:

According to the Journal Citation Reports, the journal has a 2013/2014 impact factor of 0.553, ranking it 159th out of 188 journals in the category "Plant Sciences".

References

External links 
 Acta Botanica Brasilica at SciELO

Botany journals
Multilingual journals
Publications established in 1987
Quarterly journals
Open access journals
Portuguese-language journals
Spanish-language journals
English-language journals
Academic journals published by learned and professional societies of Brazil